Gastón Matías Campi (born 6 April 1991) is an Argentine professional footballer who plays as a defender for San Lorenzo.

Career 
Campi started with Racing after the coordinator Fernando Bazan him the nod to the leadership. He debuted against Olympus in the first triumph of Racing in the Initial Tournament 2013. On 2 November 2013, in his second game, he scored his first goal against Gimnasia La Plata and made it 2-0, earning the title and Reinaldo Carlos confidence "Mustard" Merlo.

At the beginning of 2014, Campi had a good preseason and internal competition with the new reinforcement Ex Velez, Francisco Cerro, who becomes undisputed and one of the best players in a disastrous level team points will arise. Still, receives the confidence of the coach, but the Campi is returned, since their actions begin to generate impatience in the academic audience. And only when Merlo decides to send the bank, Campi enters a minute left and stamped a real goal that represents the tie 3-3 against Estudiantes on the hour. He scored a goal in the last minute against Estudiantes to finalize the 3-3 in Avellaneda. Then against Olimpo he became the tie 1-1 with which end the game.

Halfway through 2014 assumes Diego Cocca and with the arrival of Ezquiel Videla and Nelson Acevedo, is relegated as 4th midfielder. His only game in the was Cocca was against San Lorenzo de Almagro where Campi comes in late in the second period.

In July 2016, Campi joined English Championship side Reading on trial for the duration of their pre-season camp in The Netherlands. Reading decided not to offer Campi a contract after the trial.

On 5 January 2021, Campi was loaned to Fatih Karagümrük from Trabzonspor, for the second half of the 2020–21 season.

Career statistics

Honours

Club
Racing Club 
Primera División: 2014

Trabzonspor
Turkish Cup: 2019–20

References 

1991 births
Living people
Argentine footballers
Argentine expatriate footballers
Association football defenders
Sportspeople from Lanús
Argentine people of Italian descent
Racing Club de Avellaneda footballers
Atlético de Rafaela footballers
Estudiantes de La Plata footballers
G.D. Chaves players
Trabzonspor footballers
Fatih Karagümrük S.K. footballers
F.C. Arouca players
Yeni Malatyaspor footballers
San Lorenzo de Almagro footballers
Argentine Primera División players
Primeira Liga players
Süper Lig players
Argentine expatriate sportspeople in Portugal
Argentine expatriate sportspeople in Turkey
Expatriate footballers in Portugal
Expatriate footballers in Turkey